Vigar is a surname. Notable people with the surname include:

Frank Vigar (1917–2004), English cricketer
Geoff Vigar, British academic
Herbert Vigar (1883–1946), English cricketer